The 1992 NCAA basketball tournament was the 68th season in the Philippine National Collegiate Athletic Association (NCAA). The season opens on August 1 at the Araneta Coliseum and ended on October 10 with the Letran Knights regaining the title in the Seniors division and won their 11th NCAA crown.

Teams

Seniors' tournament

Elimination round
Format:
Tournament divided into two halves: winners of the two halves dispute the championship in a best-of-3 finals series unless:
A team wins both rounds. In that case, the winning team automatically wins the championship.
A third team has a better cumulative record than both finalists. In that case, the third team has to win in a playoff against the team that won the second round to face the team that won in the first round in a best-of-3 finals series.

First round team standings

Second round team standings

Cumulative standings

San Sebastian Stags were on their way to a first round sweep, scoring four straight victories and were leading by 20 points in the second half against Letran, 76-56, in their last assignment in the first round when the Knights rallied back and pulled off a 94-89 comeback victory over the Stags. 

San Sebastian clinch the first round pennant, defeating Mapua Cardinals, 81-74, in their winner-take-all showdown on August 29 at the Rizal Coliseum.  

Letran captured the second round flag, following a 108-93 victory over first round winner San Sebastian Stags in their playoff on September 30. The Knights forge a best-of-three showdown with the Stags for the Senior basketball title.

Finals

Game 1

Ronald Peña pumped in five of his 15 points in an 11-2 Letran run midway in the final half and another five at the height of San Sebastian rally late in the contest to put the Knights ahead, 87-77, with 2:25 remaining.

Game 2

 Finals Most Valuable Player: Gilbert Castillo
Ronald Peña, chosen the season's Most Valuable Player, topscored for the Knights with 22 points, and Gilbert Castillo added 19. From a 77-all deadlock, the game broke wide open on a 15-5 run by the Knights, engineered by Peña. A power outage hit the area with 42 seconds left. Letran students and supporters pour into the court for an early celebration while waiting for the lights to be restored.

See also
UAAP Season 55 men's basketball tournament

References

68
1992 in Philippine basketball